The Sonoma TrainTown Railroad (commonly called "Sonoma Train Town") is a tourist railroad and 10 acre amusement park in Sonoma, California. Its logo is based on the logo for the New York Central Railroad. Its main feature is a  gauge miniature railway, which closely corresponds to a 1:4 scale model of a  standard gauge railroad.

History
TrainTown was founded by Stanley L. Frank of Oakland, California. In 1958 he "began bringing his dream railroad to life, building everything himself, from the houses and landscaping to the line's two steam locomotives and one electric engine." The railroad opened to the public in 1968.  Frank died in 1977, and his son Robert Frank has continued to run the day-to-day operations of TrainTown alongside his wife Barbara and his daughter Monica. TrainTown also features a beautiful carousel, a mine train roller coaster, and an airplane ride.  The petting zoo includes many animals, some of whom are rescues, such as goats, chickens, ducks, llamas, sheep, and bunnies.

Descriptions
Called "an endearing and surprising modern tribute to trains", TrainTown is "an obsessively accurate model railroad".  It has been described as "the most well-developed miniature railroad" in the Americas.  It operates in "a wooded 10-acre park on a 20-minute ride past waterfalls and beautifully detailed houses, over a trestle and through several tunnels, all precisely one-quarter the size of the real thing." It carries up to 90 passengers on each ride, and includes four miles of track. A travel writer said that "the whole layout is so cleverly crafted that it's a marvel of dedication to the art of the train buff".

TrainTown features an operating replica of a New York Central Hudson locomotive, but numbered 5212, which no New York Central steam locomotive was ever numbered. This is considered by some to be the "most beautiful steam locomotive of the 1930s".

In 2009, steam locomotive 4-6-4 Hudson, number 6088,  arrived at Sonoma TrainTown. It was built in the 1980s and originally ran on the  gauge Goleta Valley Railroad.

Other attractions

The park features a petting zoo and six vintage amusement rides:
 Iron Horse Carousel
 Sonoma TrainTown Airlines
 Locomotion Scrambler
 High Iron Ferris Wheel - a 46-foot Ferris wheel
 Mine Train roller coaster - A new roller coaster that went into service in July, 2015.
 Air Scooter

References

External links

Sonoma TrainTown Railroad

15 in gauge railways in the United States
1958 establishments in California
Amusement parks in California
Amusement parks opened in 1958
Buildings and structures in Sonoma, California
Model railroads
Railroads of amusement parks in the United States
Tourist attractions in Sonoma County, California